Berlin Crevasse Field is a crevasse field,  in extent, located immediately west of Mount Berlin in Marie Byrd Land. It was mapped by the United States Geological Survey from ground surveys and from U.S. Navy air photos, 1959–66, and named by the Advisory Committee on Antarctic Names in association with Mount Berlin.

References 

Crevasse fields of Antarctica
Bodies of ice of Marie Byrd Land